Frederick Mills was  a rugby union international who represented England from 1872 to 1873.

Early life
Frederick Mills was born on 5 May 1849 in Chertsey. He attended Marlborough College.

Rugby union career
Mills made his international debut on 5 February 1872 at The Oval in the England vs Scotland match.
Of the two matches he played for his national side he was on the winning side on one occasions.
He played his final match for England on 3 March 1873 at Hamilton Crescent, Glasgow in the Scotland vs England match.

References

1849 births
1904 deaths
English rugby union players
England international rugby union players
Rugby union fullbacks
Rugby union players from Chertsey